Julian P. T. Higgins is a British biostatistician, Professor of Evidence Synthesis and Director of Research at the Department of Population Health Sciences at the University of Bristol.  Higgins was previously Chair in Evidence Synthesis at the University of York, and Programme Leader at the MRC Biostatistics Unit in Cambridge. He is also a founding trustee and a Past-President of the Society for Research Synthesis Methodology.

Early life and education
Higgins was born in North Yorkshire, where he attended the Stokesley School. He completed his undergraduate studies in mathematics at Durham University in 1992, earned a diploma in mathematical statistics from the University of Cambridge in 1993, and obtained a PhD in applied statistics from the University of Reading in 1997.

Academic career
Higgins is a Senior Investigator at the National Institute for Health Research (NIHR). An expert on meta-analysis and systematic review methodologies, Professor Higgins contributes actively to the Cochrane Collaboration, where he also serves as Senior Methods Advisor. He is a co-editor of the Cochrane Handbook for Systematic Reviews of Interventions and has been named an ISI Highly Cited researcher each year since 2015.

On 28 August 2019 Higgins, along with Jonathan Sterne, Jelena Savović, and colleagues, published in The British Medical Journal an article detailing "RoB 2", a revised tool for assessing risk of bias in randomized trials.  Assessing risk of bias is regarded as an essential component of a systematic review. The most commonly used tool for assessing risk of bias to date has been the Cochrane risk-of-bias tool, which Professor Higgins introduced in 2008. Higgins is the most cited author of The British Medical Journal.

References

External links
Faculty page

British statisticians
Biostatisticians
Academics of the University of Bristol
Living people
Alumni of the University of Reading
Cochrane Collaboration people
Academics of the University of York
Medical Research Council (United Kingdom) people
Academics of Imperial College London
Academics of University College London
Alumni of Durham University
NIHR Senior Investigators
Alumni of the University of Cambridge
Year of birth missing (living people)